The Berlin Short-faced Tumbler is a breed of fancy pigeon developed over many years of selective breeding. Berlin Short-faced Tumblers, along with other varieties of domesticated pigeons, are all descendants of the rock dove (Columba livia).

Origin
This breed was developed by crossing the Ancient Tumbler, Kazaner Tumbler and other breeds in Berlin and surrounds in the mid 19th Century.

See also 

List of pigeon breeds

References

Pigeon breeds